Butcherbirds are magpie-like birds native to Australasia.

Butcherbird may also refer to: 

Butcherbird, a common name for species of shrikes that are known for their "larder" habit of impaling captured prey on thorns, which the unrelated Australian birds share
Focke-Wulf Fw 190, a German fighter aircraft of World War II nicknamed "Butcher-bird"
 Butcher Bird, a 1993 novel by Dean Ing
 Butcher Bird, a 2007 novel by Richard Kadrey
 Butcherbird (album), a 2018 album by John Williamson